Șerban Sebastian Huidu (born July 16, 1976 in Bucharest) is a Romanian radio and TV star. He hosted, together with Mihai Găinușă, the morning show on Romanian radio station Kiss FM, and a weekly satire show (Cronica Cârcotaşilor) on the Romanian channel Prima TV.

Biography

Education and career 
Șerban Huidu graduated from the Faculty of General Economics within ASE Bucharest and, until now, he has never worked in this field. Also during college, he realized his passion for the media, working for a radio station in Bucharest where he worked for six months without being paid.

In 1995 Șerban Huidu got a job at a radio station, and in 1997 he started the show Cronica Cârcotașului on Radio 21, a pamphlet addressed to the politicians of that time. In 2000, the show began airing on Prima TV. During the same period, Mihai Găinușă joined Șerban Huidu in making the radio show. In just one year, Mihai Găinușă also became his set partner, so that since 2001 the show Cronica Cârcotașului is transformed into Cronica Cârcotașilor. In 2003 the two filmmakers moved from Radio 21 to Kiss FM.

Accidents 
On December 29, 2010, he was hospitalized in the University Hospital of Innsbruck, Austria, with a cranial haemorrhage, following a serious ski accident. On October 16, 2011, Huidu caused a road accident on DN1 in the area of Timișu de Sus, Brașov County, resulting in 3 deaths. In 2009, 1 km away from the site, Huidu had made an illegal overtaking and his driving license was suspended for a month.

Income 
According to data from the Ministry of Finance, Șerban Huidu had a monthly income of 53,000 euros per month from television activities during 2005-2013. Its total net profit was 25,762,995 lei, ie approximately 5.8 million euros. It is equivalent to 644,000 euros per year, which means 53,000 euros per month. Huidu registered his trademarks "Cronica Carcotașilor", "Top Rușinică", "Dezbrăcatu '", "Puștiu", "Bebelușe" and "Mistrețu" on a company where he is the majority associate and administrator.

References

External links
  Șerban Huidu's official Kiss FM webpage
  Șerban Huidu's webpage on Cronica Cârcotașilor site
  Șerban Huidu's webpage on Prima TV
  Șerban Huidu's official blog

Romanian television presenters
Romanian radio presenters
Romanian satirists
Bucharest Academy of Economic Studies alumni
Television people from Bucharest
1976 births
Living people